StoneLoops! of Jurassica is a 2D bubble shooter game developed by Codeminion and distributed in 2008 by Game Club Cafe for Microsoft Windows,  Apple Macintosh, and the iPhone. The game was later removed from the iPhone after the game developer MumboJumbo filed a complaint with Apple stating that StoneLoops infringed upon their copyrights as the game mimicked the look of and used some of the source code of their game Luxor.

Gameplay
The game has a prehistoric theme and its premise centers around a snail-like creature pushing around a string of colored stone marbles. Players shoot marbles at the loop in order to clear the level and prevent the string from reaching a specific end point, which will cause the player to lose the level. Marbles can be cleared by the player shooting a similarly colored marble at a grouping that contains two or more marbles of the same color. Players will additionally encounter dark silver marbles that cannot be cleared except in specific circumstances. During game play players can collect bonus items that can make the game easier and also remove marbles, including the dark silver marbles. Players can gain these items by playing a bonus level.

The game can be played in three modes, classic, strategy, and survival, and each mode has four difficulty settings, which range from easy to grand master.

Reception
Gamezebo gave StoneLoops! a rating of 4.5/5, praising it for its graphics, sound, and ease of play while also criticizing it for having an unoriginal premise. TouchArcade reviewed the iPhone version and also reviewed the game favorably, commenting that its gameplay was addictive.

References

IOS games
Windows games
MacOS games
Shooter video games
2008 video games
Casual games
Unauthorized video games
Video game clones
Video games developed in Poland
Video games set in prehistory
Single-player video games